The AT&T Byron Nelson is a golf tournament in Texas on the PGA Tour, currently hosted by TPC Craig Ranch in McKinney, northeast of Dallas.  Held in May, it is one of two PGA Tour stops in the Dallas-Fort Worth Metroplex – which until the 2020-21 PGA Tour, was the only metropolitan area to host two events on separate courses in the area (Las Vegas, Nevada and Savannah, Georgia have since hosted two events on two separate courses). The tournament is the leading fundraiser for charity on the PGA Tour and has raised more than $143 million. For much of its history, it was the only PGA Tour stop named after a professional golfer, and remains one of only two such events, along with the Arnold Palmer Invitational. As host, Byron Nelson  commonly made appearances during the tournament. It is hosted by the Salesmanship Club of Dallas, a 600-member civic organization, and has benefited the club's nonprofit Momentous Institute since its inception.

For its first several decades, the tournament was played at various courses in Dallas. Nelson, a Texas native raised in Fort Worth, was the tournament's first winner in 1944, when it was played at Lakewood Country Club. The following year it was played at Dallas Country Club, and then in 1946 moved to Brook Hollow Golf Club. For the better part of the next decade the event was not contested, until two iterations of it were held in 1956, both at Preston Hollow Country Club. In 1957, the event moved to Glen Lake Country Club before it began a decade-long relationship with Oak Cliff Country Club, from 1958 to 1967.

In 1968, the event was renamed the Byron Nelson Golf Classic and its title, through a series of sponsors, has continuously included Nelson's name. That same year the event moved to Preston Trail Golf Club, where it was played through 1982, then moved to venues in Irving: Las Colinas Sports Club (1983–1985) and TPC at Las Colinas (1986–1993).

Beginning in 1994, the tournament was played at two courses, the Tournament Players Course and the Cottonwood Valley Course, both located at the Four Seasons. Previously only the TPC was used, but since the tournament was played in May (during the height of the North Texas storm season), the weather played havoc with the tournament in some years, causing several delays and shortened tournaments. Therefore, the decision was made to add the Cottonwood Valley course in order to shorten the amount of time needed to complete the first two rounds. The first two rounds were played on both courses (each player played one round on each course); after the cut was determined, the TPC is used exclusively for the final two rounds.  However, in 2008 the tournament reverted to using only the TPC course, which was significantly renovated.

Hewlett-Packard (HP) bought the previous title sponsor, Electronic Data Systems (EDS) in mid-2008. The agreement ran through 2014, with AT&T becoming the title sponsor in 2015; the tournament moved to the new Trinity Forest Golf Club, southeast of downtown Dallas, in 2018. Not played in 2020 due to the COVID-19 pandemic, it moved north to TPC Craig Ranch in McKinney in 2021.

Tournament highlights
 1956: Peter Thomson, a five-time winner of The Open Championship shoots a final round 63, then makes birdie on the first two holes of sudden death to defeat Gene Littler and Cary Middlecoff.  It was his one and only PGA Tour victory in the United States. 
 1976: Mark Hayes becomes the first wire to wire winner of the Nelson.
 1981: Bruce Lietzke defeated Tom Watson in a playoff spoiling Watson's bid for a 4th straight Nelson triumph.
 1985: Bob Eastwood defeated Payne Stewart in a playoff after coming to the 72nd hole trailing Stewart by three shots. Eastwood made birdie on the final hole while Stewart made double bogey. Stewart made yet another double bogey on the first hole of sudden death to give Eastwood the title. 
 1994: Neal Lancaster won the first ever six-player sudden death playoff in PGA Tour history. He made a birdie on the first playoff hole to defeat Tom Byrum, Mark Carnevale, David Edwards, Yoshi Mizumaki, and David Ogrin.
 2005: Tiger Woods' record streak of 142 cuts made came to an end at this tournament.
 2006: After graduating from Q school, Brett Wetterich's win propels him to a surprise Ryder Cup appearance.
 2008: Australian Adam Scott sank a 48-foot putt on the third playoff hole to clinch victory over American Ryan Moore.
 2010: At age 16, Jordan Spieth (the defending U.S. Junior Amateur champion, and a student at nearby Jesuit College Preparatory School) became the youngest player to play in the tournament, courtesy of a sponsor's exemption (the first one granted since 1995).  Spieth would make the cut (becoming the sixth-youngest person in PGA Tour history to make a professional tour event cut) and finish 16th overall.  (In 2011 Spieth would again be granted a sponsor's exemption and would again make the cut, finishing 32nd overall.)
 2013: Keegan Bradley hits a course-record 60 (−10) in the first round. Bradley leads the first three rounds, but Bae Sang-moon earned the win.
 2018: Aaron Wise sets the tournament record.
 2019: Kang Sung-hoon won his first PGA Tour title in his 159th start. Scott Piercy went bogey-free for the entire tournament, becoming the first to do so in a 72-hole PGA Tour event since Charles Howell III at the 2010 Greenbrier Classic.

Winners

Note: Green highlight indicates scoring records.
Sources:

Multiple winners
Six men have won this tournament more than once through 2022.
4 wins
Tom Watson: 1975, 1978, 1979, 1980
3 wins
Sam Snead: 1945, 1957, 1958
2 wins
Jack Nicklaus: 1970, 1971
Bruce Lietzke: 1981, 1988
Sergio García: 2004, 2016
Lee Kyoung-hoon: 2021, 2022

See also
Dallas Open (1926)

Notes

References

External links

Coverage on the PGA Tour's official site
Media Guide

PGA Tour events
Golf in Texas
Sports in Irving, Texas
Sports in Dallas
Recurring sporting events established in 1944
1944 establishments in Texas